Bernardo Nicolás Cuesta (born 20 December 1988) is an Argentine professional footballer who plays for Liga 1 club Melgar.

Career
On 19 December 2019, it was confirmed that Cuesta would join the Thai league club Buriram United for the 2020 season.

References
 
 

1988 births
Living people
Association football forwards
Argentine footballers
Argentine expatriate footballers
Tiro Federal footballers
The Strongest players
FBC Melgar footballers
Atlético Junior footballers
C.D. Huachipato footballers
Primera Nacional players
Torneo Argentino A players
Categoría Primera A players
Chilean Primera División players
Bolivian Primera División players
Peruvian Primera División players
Expatriate footballers in Chile
Expatriate footballers in Colombia
Expatriate footballers in Bolivia
Expatriate footballers in Peru
Sportspeople from Santa Fe Province